Suzanne Célina Marie Julie Joséphine Leclercq (March 28, 1901 – June 12, 1994) was a Belgian paleobotanist and paleontologist known for her study of Devonian period plants.

Biography 
She earned her Ph.D. at the University of Liège, and worked in Belgium and the United Kingdom throughout her research career. 

She was a member of many scientific and professional societies, including the Botanical Society of America, the Paleobotanical Society of India, and the Geological Society of Belgium, which she led from 1953 to 1954. Leclercq was a professor of stratigraphy and paleophytology at her alma mater throughout her career, though she conducted research at the British Museum, the Geological Survey in London, the University of Glasgow, University of Manchester, University College London, and the University of Cambridge.

References

20th-century Belgian botanists
Women botanists
Women paleontologists
Paleobotanists
1901 births
1994 deaths
20th-century Belgian women scientists